Bob Spitulski (born September 10, 1969) is a former professional American football linebacker for the Seattle Seahawks and the St. Louis Rams in the National Football League.

Spitulski attended the University of Central Florida and was selected in the third round of the 1992 NFL Draft by the Seattle Seahawks.

References

1969 births
Living people
Sportspeople from Toledo, Ohio
St. Louis Rams players
Seattle Seahawks players
UCF Knights football players
American football linebackers
Bishop Moore High School alumni